The Geography of Thought: How Asians and Westerners Think Differently...and Why is a book by social psychologist Richard Nisbett that was published by Free Press in 2003. By analyzing the differences between Asia and the West, it argues that cultural differences affect people's thought processes more significantly than believed.

Thesis
In the book, Nisbett demonstrates that "people actually think about—and even see—the world differently because of differing ecologies, social structures, philosophies, and educational systems that date back to ancient Greece and China". At its core, the book assumes that human behavior is not “hard-wired” but a function of culture.

The book proposes that the passion for strong ontology and scientific rationality based on forward chaining from axioms is essentially a "Western" phenomenon. Ancient Greece's passion for abstract categories into which the entire world can be taxonomically arranged, he claims, is prototypically Western, as is the notion of causality.

In other words, he claims that the law of the excluded middle is not applied in Chinese thought, and that a different standard applies. This has been described by other thinkers as being hermeneutic reasonableness.

Implications
There are several implications to Nisbett's theory. For instance, in law, Eastern and Western cultures assign different priorities to, and roles of, the law in society. The ratio of lawyers to engineers is forty times higher in the US than in Japan. Moreover, the role of US lawyers is, generally, to handle legal confrontations, and the aim is demands for justice with a clear winner and loser based upon universal principles of justice that apply equally to everyone. In contrast, Eastern lawyers are more often used as intermediaries to reduce hostilities, and reach a compromise; the principles they operate by are more flexible and circumstantial.

Another aspect where there is great divergence between these two systems of thought concerns human rights. In the West, there is more or less a single view of the relationship between individuals and states, individuals are all separate units, and enter into a social contract with one another which gives them certain rights. East Asians, as well as most people outside the West, however, 'view societies not as aggregates of individuals but as molecules, or organisms. As a consequence, there is little or no conception of rights that inhere in the individual,' and in particular, '[f]or the Chinese, any conception of rights is based on a part-whole as opposed to a one-many conception of society' (ibid, 198). Therefore, for Western conceptions to be adopted outside the West, this requires 'not just a different moral code, but a different conception of the nature of the individual' (ibid, 199).

There are also fundamentally different conceptions of religion in the East and West. In Eastern religion, there is a "both/and" mentality more so than the "right/wrong" one that is proliferate in the West. As a result, Eastern religion tends to be more tolerant and accommodating towards a plurality of religious beliefs and ideas, for example you can identify as Buddhist, Confucian and Christian in Japan and Korean (and pre-communist China), and as a result, religious wars have been historically rare. In Western religion, monotheism involves a requirement for a God to monopolize belief, which owes to its Abrahamic roots, and religious wars have been historically commonplace. Furthermore, the role of cycles and recurrences has had a large impact on Eastern religions, but less so in Western religions. This is evident in the fact that sin can be atoned for in Eastern religion, and to a degree in Christianity, but it is ineradicable in Protestantism (ibid, 199–200).

Challenges and Reception
The contrasts drawn in the book may be questioned. Nisbett says the Chinese see events as embedded in a meaningful whole in which elements are constantly changing and rearranging themselves; corresponding ideas in western science and systems thinking are holism, adaptation and evolution. Nisbett says the Chinese don't apply the law of the excluded middle; corresponding ideas in western science and philosophy are "degrees of truth" and "fuzzy logic". He says Chinese thinking allows incompatibility between A being the case and not the case, which seems contrary to the non-pluralist, totalitarian, authoritairian control of Chinese society, social media, and the treatment of religious minorities. He tends to contrast China with the US, where another author might contrast Europe with the US. 

Cultural anthropologist Sherry Ortner wrote a critical review in The New York Times, pointing out its methodological flaws (most of the experimental subjects are college students, leading to sample bias) as well as interpretational ones ("How much difference does there have to be between the Asians and the Westerners in a particular experiment to demonstrate a cultural divide?"). She was most critical about his "relentless attempt to cram everything into the Asian/Western dichotomy...into these monolithic units of East and West" without really addressing "differences within the categories" such as gender, religion, ethnicity, which are "occasionally acknowledged, but generally set aside"..

Other reviews were more comfortable with Nisbett's generalities and word usage. He notes that "East Asians" indicate Chinese, Japanese, and Koreans, while "Westerners" typically means "America, but can be extended to the rest of the Anglosphere, and occasionally also to Europe". Robert Sternberg, president of the American Psychological Association, called it a "landmark book".

See also
 Cultural psychology
 Nature versus nurture

References

External links 
 
 The book was also the model for a documentary by the Korean TV channel EBS called "The East and the West":
 "Review of The East and the West"
 "EBS Documentary: The East and the West (Part 1)"
 "EBS Documentary: The East and the West (Part 2)"

2003 non-fiction books
Books by Richard E. Nisbett
Logic books
Race and intelligence controversy